St Saviour's Church, Norwich is a Grade I listed redundant parish church of the Church of England located in the historical centre of Norwich, England.

History

The church dates from the 14th century. The south porch was rebuilt in 1723 and tower was lowered in a large restoration between 1852 and 1853. The chancel was restored in 1923. The composer Osbert Parsley evidently married in 1558 and lived for a period in the parish.

Organ

The church had an organ dating from 1861 by Mark Noble. A specification of the organ can be found on the National Pipe Organ Register.

References

Saviour
Grade I listed buildings in Norfolk